Villaviciosa is a town and municipality in the autonomous community of Asturias, Spain. José Ángel Hevia Velasco was born in the town. Villaviciosa is important for the production of cider. The town also produces milk and relies on tourism, with natural landscapes and beaches.

Geography

Villaviciosa is situated on the central eastern coastline, and borders the Asturian municipalities of Gijón and Siero to the west, Sariego, Nava, Cabranes and Piloña to the south and Colunga to the east. The total area is

Demographics 
It had a population of 14,962 in 2011.

History
In prehistory, several Hill forts surrounded Villaviciosa, most located in the axis of the ria, near Rodiles. During the time of the Kingdom of Asturias in the 8th century, the population migrated to areas such as Amandi, Camoca, and Bedriñana, appearing frequently in the Maliayo territory.

By the time of Alfonso IX of León, in the 13th century, the municipality had begun to repopulate, as witnessed in 17 October 1270, when King Alfonso X The Wise created the document evidencing the establishment of a population in Buetes. At the same time, a Cistercian Order emerged in the valley of Boides creating the Monasterio de Santa María de Valdediós.

In the 16th century, Holy Roman Emperor Charles V landed and was hosted in the town (the most important event in village history). The King arrived at the port of Tazones due to a storm that altered his course on the way to Santander.

In the 19th century, the town was repeatedly attacked. It was occupied several times by French troops during the Peninsular War. In 1835, the community was officially established and municipal business grew significantly due to its location on the river, which at the time was navigable.

Parroquias

The capital is the town of the same name.

Villaviciosa includes 41 parroquias (parishes):

Notable buildings

Church of San Salvador de Valdediós
Church of Santa Eulalia de la Lloraza
Iglesia de Santo Tomás
Monasterio de San Martín

References 

Municipalities in Asturias

Bien de Interés Cultural landmarks in Asturias